Louisa Starr, later Louisa Canziani (1845–25 May 1909), was a British painter.

Biography
Starr was born in London and lived on Russell Square when she became a copyist at the British Museum.  Studying at the Royal Academy, she showed her first work there in 1866 and by 1876 had showed 17 paintings. She won a gold medal at the Royal Academy for history painting in 1867. She was the first woman to do so and was followed by Jessie Macgregor's gold medal in 1871, but the next  woman to do so was not until 1909.

She married Enrico Canziani and thereafter signed her works with her married name. Her daughter Estella Canziani also became an artist.

She exhibited   her work at the Palace of Fine Arts at the 1893 World's Columbian Exposition in Chicago, Illinois.

Her painting Sintram and his mother was included in the 1905 book Women Painters of the World.

Starr died in London in 25 May 1909 and was buried in the Starr family grave (plot no.19975) on the western side of Highgate Cemetery near the grave of Elizabeth Siddal.

Gallery

References

External links

 
Louisa Starr Canziani on artnet

1845 births
1909 deaths
Burials at Highgate Cemetery
19th-century British painters
19th-century British women artists
Artists from London
British women painters
British women writers
19th-century women writers